Itzin is a surname. Notable people with the surname include:

 Catherine Itzin (1944–2010), American activist
 Gregory Itzin (1948–2022), American actor